Valeriy Ivashchenko (born 25 November 1980) is a former Ukrainian football midfielder and current coach who is manager of Obolon Kyiv.

Personal life 
Valeriy Ivashchenko is an older brother of another Ukrainian footballer Oleksandr Ivashchenko.

External links

1980 births
Living people
Ukrainian footballers
Ukrainian football managers
FC Metalurh Zaporizhzhia players
FC Metalurh-2 Zaporizhzhia players
FC Spartak Ivano-Frankivsk players
FC Kalush players
FC Obolon-Brovar Kyiv players
FC Naftovyk-Ukrnafta Okhtyrka players
FC Oleksandriya players
FC Obolon-2 Kyiv players
Ukrainian Premier League players
FC Obolon Kyiv managers
FC Obolon-2 Kyiv managers
Association football midfielders